Ladislav Rygl may refer to:

 Ladislav Rygl, Sr. (born 1947), Czech Nordic skier who won the combined event at the 1970 FIS Nordic World Ski Championships in Vysoké Tatry
 Ladislav Rygl, Jr. (born 1976), his son, who competed in Nordic combined from 1995 to 2006